Ceramida malacensis is a species of beetle in the Melolonthinae subfamily. It was described by Jules Pierre Rambur in 1843 and is found in Portugal and Spain.

References

Beetles described in 1843
Beetles of Europe
Melolonthinae